Odopoia is a genus of wasps in the family Torymidae, containing the following species:

 Odopoia atra Walker, 1871
 Odopoia dentatinota (Girault, 1925)
 Odopoia jianfengica Xiao & Jiao, 2012
 Odopoia josephinae Boucek, 1988
 Odopoia philippiae (Risbec, 1952)
 Odopoia reticulata Sureshan, 2007
 Odopoia wenchangica Xiao & Hu, 2012

References

Taxa named by Francis Walker (entomologist)
Hymenoptera genera
Chalcidoidea